Dominikowo  is a village in the administrative district of Gmina Drawno, within Choszczno County, West Pomeranian Voivodeship, in north-western Poland.

The historic Church of the Assumption, dating back to the 16th century, is located in the village.

Until 1945 the area was part of Germany.

References

Dominikowo